Tennessee's 31st Senate district is one of 33 districts in the Tennessee Senate. It has been represented by Republican Brent Taylor (Tennessee politician) since 2022.

Geography
District 31 covers parts of Memphis and its immediate suburbs to the east, including most of Germantown and Cordova, the western edge of Collierville, and some of unincorporated Shelby County. 

The district overlaps with Tennessee's 8th and 9th congressional districts, and with the 83rd, 84th, 85th, 90th, 91st, 93rd, 95th, 96th, and 97th districts of the Tennessee House of Representatives.

Recent election results
Tennessee Senators are elected to staggered four-year terms, with odd-numbered districts holding elections in midterm years and even-numbered districts holding elections in presidential years.

2018

2014

Federal and statewide results in District 31

References 

31
Shelby County, Tennessee